Southgate Hockey Club is a field hockey club based at Southgate Hockey Centre in Trent Park, near Oakwood in London.

The men's 1st XI play in the Men's England Hockey League. The club has 9 men's sides, 5 ladies' sides and a large junior section.

History
The club was formed in 1886. Matches were initially played in Broomfield Park, Palmers Green; in 1890 the club relocated to the Walker Ground on Waterfall Road. In order to meet the challenge created by the introduction of artificial grass pitches, the club began hiring pitches away from the Walker Ground from around 1985. After a search for a new location, the club relocated to Southgate Hockey Centre during the 1997/98 season.

For most of its history the club has provided many players for the national side and, prior to the formation of organised leagues in 1968, featuring prominently in the unofficial leagues published in the press.

The club won the Hockey Association Cup in 1975, 1980, 1982, 1985, 1986, 1987 and 1988. The club won the inaugural National League in the season 1988/89, bringing the total of national titles to eight.

The club won the European Club Championship in 1976, 1977 and 1978, and won bronze in 1975 and 1983. In 1999, the club won the English indoor hockey title.

Honours
 EuroHockey Club Champions Cup
 Winners: 1976, 1977, 1978: 3
 National League
 Winners: 1976–77, 1977–78, 1987–88, 1988–89: 4
 National Cup
 1973–74, 1974–75, 1981–82, 1984–85, 1985–86, 1986–87, 1987–88: 7

Notable players

Men's internationals
/

 Robert Cattrall 

 Richard Gay
 James Kyriakides

 Richard Gay

References

 
English field hockey clubs
1886 establishments in England
Field hockey clubs established in 1886
Field hockey in London
Southgate, London
Sport in the London Borough of Enfield